The 2000 Molson Indy Vancouver was a Championship Auto Racing Teams (CART) motor race held on September 3, 2000 at Concord Pacific Place in Vancouver, British Columbia, Canada. It was the 15th round of the 2000 CART season. Paul Tracy won the race by less than half a second over his teammate Dario Franchitti with Adrian Fernández taking third place.

The race was an emotional affair, as it was former CART driver Greg Moore's home event and the first since his death at the 1999 Marlboro 500. His number, #99, was retired before the start of the race while Canadian sports legend Wayne Gretzky (who also sported #99 during his NHL career) gave the command to start engines.

Franchitti was handily leading the race until he stalled the car during a pitstop under caution, allowing Tracy to streak by in the pitlane and into first place. While the race did not see a lot of on-track passing, multiple cars were taken out as a result of crashes and on-track incidents. A total of 63,677 fans attended the event.

Qualifying

Race

– Includes two bonus points for leading the most laps and being the fastest qualifier.

Race statistics
Lead changes: 3 among 3 drivers

Standings after the race

Drivers' standings

References

Vancouver Grand Prix, 2000
Indy Vancouver
Molson Indy Vancouver
2000 in British Columbia